The Jules Desurmont Worsted Company Mill is a historic mill at 84 Fairmount Street in Woonsocket, Rhode Island.  The mill complex consists of three brick buildings, erected 1907-10 by Jules Desurmont, the owner of a textile firm in Tourcoing, a city in northern France, who had been drawn to Woonsocket by the promotional activities of Aram Pothier.  The mill produced French worsted wool yarn until 1952, and was used for many years thereafter by smaller textile and industrial concerns.

The mill complex was listed on the National Register of Historic Places in 2007.

See also
National Register of Historic Places listings in Providence County, Rhode Island

References

Industrial buildings and structures on the National Register of Historic Places in Rhode Island
Industrial buildings completed in 1907
Buildings and structures in Woonsocket, Rhode Island
National Register of Historic Places in Providence County, Rhode Island